Levelland High School is a public high school located in Levelland, Texas, United States. It is part of the Levelland Independent School District located in central Hockley County and classified as a 4A school by the University Interscholastic League. In 2015, the school was rated "Met Standard" by the Texas Education Agency.

Athletics
The Levelland Lobos compete in the following sports:

American football
Baseball
Basketball
Cross country
Golf
Powerlifting
Softball
Tennis
Track and field
Volleyball

State titles
Girls' basketball -
1983(4A), 1986(4A), 1987(4A), 1988(4A), 1989(4A), 1991(4A), 1997(4A)

State finalists
Girls' basketball -
1982(4A), 1984(4A), 1993(4A)

Notable alumni
 Beau Boulter (class of 1960), member of the United States House of Representatives for Texas's 13th congressional district from 1985 to 1989
 Ronny Jackson (class of 1985), Physician to the President under the Obama and Trump administrations.

References

External links
Levelland ISD

Schools in Hockley County, Texas
Public high schools in Texas